Qianliu Yi Ethnic Township is an ethnic township in Lancang Lahu Autonomous County, Yunnan, China.

Administrative division
As of 2016, the township is divided into fifteen villages: 
Qiannuo
Zhanai
Daqiaotou
Xinzhai
Mangnong
Tianba
Dagang
Longtan
Xincheng
Heping
Shuiyuan
Malihe
Xiaofofang
Lasa
Pingzhang

History
As a communication hub in Lancang Lahu Autonomous County, the township was even a place of strategic importance during the Qing dynasty (1644–1911) and Republic of China (1912-1949).

In 1940, Mangnuo Township was set up. In 1948, it was renamed "Qianliu Township". 

After the establishment of the Communist State, its name was changed to "Qianliu District". In 1969 it was renamed "Yuejin Commune", named after the Great Leap Forward. And it was renamed "Qianliu Commune" in 1971. In 1988, the Qianliu Yi Ethnic Township was officially incorporated.

Geography
The township is situated at northeastern Lancang Lahu Autonomous County. It is surrounded by Dashan Township on the north, Donghe Township and Nanling Township on the west, Jinggu Dai and Yi Autonomous County on the east, and Nuozhadu Town on the south.

The Lancang River flows through the township. Other rivers and streams include Mangpa River and Mengsa River.

Economy
The local economy is primarily based upon agriculture and local industry. Industry is mainly based on wine-making and ceramics. The region abounds with iron, copper, and manganese. Significant crops include grain, corn, peanut, sugarcane, tea, and coffee bean.

Demographics

As of 2017, the National Bureau of Statistics of China estimates the township's population now to be 43,031.

References

Bibliography

Townships of Pu'er City
Divisions of Lancang Lahu Autonomous County
Yi ethnic townships